The SR20DET is a  straight-four four-stroke gasoline engine that is part of the SR family of engines from Nissan, produced from 1989 to 2002. It is a turbocharged version of the SR20DE engine and is a replacement of the CA18DET engine.

The SR20DET, like with the outgoing CA18DET, was a turbocharged intercooled engine in top form. It was Nissan's popular four-cylinder engine fitted into a wide variety of cars, most notably the S13-chassis Nissan Silvia and 180SX. It also came in the Pulsar GTI-R, Nissan NX Coupe and the Nissan Bluebird. It replaced the CA18DE and CA18DET engines that originally powered the Silvia and 180SX from the S12-chassis and prior. The previous CA18DET was deemed too expensive to produce (due to its cast-iron block) and no longer met Japanese emission standards, and so was replaced with the SR20DET.

The SR20DET is a popular choice as an engine swap in North American 240SXs (more specifically the USDM and Canadian models), as they use the SOHC KA24E for earlier models, or the DOHC KA24DE for later models. Both are naturally aspirated engines and are much less-powerful than the CA18DET and SR20DET engines, producing  and  respectively. SR20DET engine swaps are becoming more commonplace due to the aftermarket forced induction options available for the SR20DET. There are many tuning shops out there that specialized only in SR20DET swaps.

Model code breakdown
The breakdown of the engine codes are as follows:

 SR - Engine family
 20 - 2.0 liter displacement
 D  - Dual overhead camshaft
 E  - Multi-port fuel injection
 T  - Turbocharger
NOTE: The lack of a "D" in some engine identifications indicates an SOHC cylinder head.

For more information of Nissan's engine naming conventions, see list of Nissan engines.

History

The SR20DET was first introduced in the U12 Nissan Bluebird 2000SSS ATTESA Limited in a transverse-mounted front-wheel drive/four-wheel drive form in October 1989. The first revisions of the rear-wheel drive S13 Nissan Silvia and Nissan 180SX produced in 1991 were built with a longitudinally-mounted SR20DET. Others had the naturally aspirated SR20DE. The engine then went on to be used in a number of Nissan vehicles, including the Nissan Avenir in 1995, the Nissan R'nessa in 1997 and the Nissan Liberty in 1999. The SR20DET (along with the naturally-aspirated SR20DE) was retired in most Nissan vehicles in August 2002 (including the S15 Nissan Silvia), and were replaced with the QR20DE engine in most applications.

Out of all the Nissan models produced with the SR20DET engine, the Silvia was the longest-running model to use it, starting with the S13 series in 1991 and ending with the S15 series in 2002. The S14 and S15 series used a bigger turbocharger than the S13 series.

Valve cover colors
The colors of the valve covers seem to relate to the year the engine was produced:

1989–1994 "Red top" - Came from U12/13 Bluebird, S13 Silvia and 180SX pre-94 (Garrett T25G turbo) 370cc injectors were used.

1994–1998 "Black top" - Came from 180SX's post-94 (Garrett T25G turbo)

1991–1998 "Black top" - 91–98 Silvias - Variable Cam Timing or VCT was introduced on the intake cam (Garrett T28 journal bearing turbo for Australian and European markets and Garrett T28 Ball Bearing turbo for the Japanese market) 370cc injectors were used.

1995–2002 "Silver top" - 95-02 Avenirs and 97-01 R'nessas.

1999–2002 "Black top" - 99–02 Silvias. Same VCT as above, 6-speed manual transmission (Garrett Journal Bearing T28 for Europe and Australia and Ball Bearing T28 turbo for Japan) 480cc injectors were used and the intake manifold was redesigned.

Engine specifications
 DOHC 4 valves per cylinder, Chain driven cam sprockets
 Bore × Stroke of  × 
 Displacement of 

1990–1994 RNN14 Pulsar GTI-R
Compressor Flow: 33 lb/MIN
Throttle Body: Quad
Injector Flow: 440cc/min
Ignition Timing: 20º BTDC

1991–1998 180SX
Throttle Body Bore: 60 mm
Injector Flow: 370cc/min

1995–1999 S14 Silvia
Throttle Body Bore: 50 mm
Injector Flow: 370cc/min

1999–2002 S15 Silvia
Throttle Body Bore: 50 mm
Injector Flow: 444cc/min

Comparison table

Twin-turbo modifications
While all factory manufactured SR20DET's featured only a single turbo unit, some aftermarket tuners have engineered working twin-turbo configurations. One such kit produced by ENDLESS Japan in 2008 featured two GReddy TD05-16G turbines in parallel. These were mounted on a custom exhaust manifold and downpipe, and required heavy modifications to the engine bay to fit correctly. This twin-turbo setup achieved its peak power at 2.2 bar between 5,500–6,000 RPM, and costs ¥300,000.

Applications

The SR20DET is used in a number of Nissan vehicles produced from 1989 to 2002, including the Nissan Silvia line of compact sports cars. Below is a list of these.

See also

 List of Nissan engines

References

SR